My Friend Harry (German: Mein Freund Harry) is a 1928 German silent film directed by Max Obal and Rudolf Walther-Fein and starring Harry Liedtke, Maria Paudler and Otto Wallburg.

The film's art direction was by Botho Hoefer and Hans Minzloff.

Cast
 Harry Liedtke as Harry Gill 
 Maria Paudler as May Elliot  
 Otto Wallburg as Gen.Dir. Fredy Sanderson  
 Bruno Kastner as Luigi Vicelli  
 Rina Maggi as Diane de Lusigny  
 Cord Morton as Ein Artist  
 Ida Wüst as Die Tante  
 Karl Falkenberg as Ein Diener

References

Bibliography
 Goble, Alan. The Complete Index to Literary Sources in Film. Walter de Gruyter, 1999.

External links

1928 films
Films of the Weimar Republic
German silent feature films
Films directed by Max Obal
Films directed by Rudolf Walther-Fein
Films based on German novels
German black-and-white films